Silda is an island in Kinn Municipality in Vestland county, Norway. This island is the site of the 1810 Battle of Silda. In 2014, there were 12 inhabitants on the island, which is only accessible by boat.

Name
The name of the island comes from the Norwegian language word sild which means herring, since herring fishing has been important in the region for centuries.

Media gallery

See also
 List of islands of Norway

References

Kinn
Islands of Vestland